Knez Selo is a village situated in Niš municipality in Serbia.

Notable individuals
 Ignatije Midić

References

Populated places in Nišava District